The Louth Senior Hurling Championship is an annual Gaelic Athletic Association competition organised by Louth GAA among the top hurling clubs in County Louth, Ireland.  The winner qualifies to represent the county in the Leinster Junior Club Hurling Championship, the winner of which progresses to the All-Ireland Junior Club Hurling Championship.

St. Fechins are the current (2022) champions.  

The competition was run as a Junior Championship between 1902 and 1986, and became a senior championship in 1987.

Top winners

Roll of honour

References

External links
 Official Louth Website
 Louth on Hoganstand
 Louth Club GAA

Hurling competitions in Leinster
Louth GAA club championships
Senior hurling county championships